"Sanford and Son Theme (The Streetbeater)" is the theme to the 1970s sitcom Sanford and Son. It was composed by Quincy Jones.

Overview
"The Streetbeater" was first released by A&M Records on Jones's 1973 album You've Got It Bad Girl and as a single from that album. It is also featured on his Greatest Hits album.

Although the piece itself did not reach Billboard status for that year, it has maintained mainstream popularity, ranking 9th in a Rolling Stone Reader Poll of Television Theme Songs

Other recordings
Harry James recorded a version in 1979 on his album Still Harry After All These Years (Sheffield Lab LAB 11).

References

Comedy television theme songs
Quincy Jones songs
1973 songs
Funk songs
Songs written by Quincy Jones
A&M Records singles